Saroornagar Indoor Stadium is an indoor sporting arena located in Hyderabad, India.  The capacity of the arena is 2,000 people.  And it has even got a wide number of sports being taught all along the year and many national and international players have emerged from that stadium.

Indoor arenas in India
Sports venues in Telangana
Sports venues in Hyderabad, India
Sport in Hyderabad, India
Year of establishment missing